Mary Jeanette Murray is an American Republican politician from Cohasset, Massachusetts. She represented the 3rd Plymouth district in the Massachusetts House of Representatives from 1977 to 2001.

See also
 1977-1978 Massachusetts legislature

References

Year of birth missing
Year of death missing
Members of the Massachusetts House of Representatives
Women state legislators in Massachusetts
20th-century American women politicians
20th-century American politicians
People from Cohasset, Massachusetts